CAM4.com (commonly abbreviated CAM4), is a live streaming website featuring live webcam performances, filtered by female, male, transgender or couples of primarily amateur performers. Broadcasts on CAM4 often feature nudity and sexual activity often ranging from striptease and dirty talk to masturbation with sex toys.

Concept
CAM4 is used mostly by amateur webcam performers who like to broadcast just for the fun of it or to earn money for their live performances on the site. Customers of the site can purchase virtual tokens, which can be used to tip performers or watch private shows. Customers can use text based live chat to talk to each other or in each performer's room. The performers use a webcam and microphone to broadcast live video and audio to their room.

Performers on CAM4 may be coached by Nikki Night, a former cam model and "the porn industry's leading camgirl coach."

In May 2016, CAM4 partnered with VRtube.xxx to launch CAM4VR, a 360° 3D virtual reality live cam experience available on the CAM4 platform. VRTube.xxx co-founder, Ela Darling spearheaded the initiative.  The site is working with Ela Darling to distribute virtual reality cameras to models.

Ms. Darling was later followed by world-famous adult actress Jelena Jenson, who joined CAM4 in January, 2017 as event marketing manager and brand ambassador.

CAM4 has paid out more than $100m in performer commissions since its inception in 2007.

Strategic partnerships
In February 2017, CAM4 announced a partnership with teledildonics manufacturer Kiiroo, launching a "live touch" feature that sync's the vibration of the Kiiroo sex toy to tokens tipped during a live webcam show.

Sponsorships and philanthropy

CAM4 is a diamond member of the Free Speech Coalition and has been a title sponsor of the Association of Sites Advocating Child Protection (ASACP) since 2011.

In September 2017, CAM4 teamed up with American model and activist Amber Rose in support of The Amber Rose SlutWalk, a nonprofit advocacy organization that works to end slut-shaming and to spark a conversation on women's empowerment and LGBTQ rights.

CAM4 is a principal sponsor of the New York AIDS Walk.

In September 2021, CAM4 announced its renewed sponsorship of Pineapple Support, a non-profit organization that offers low cost mental health services for adult industry professionals.

Campaigns
In 2016, CAM4 commissioned a global research study from French Research firm iFop, designed to better understand female orgasm habits and the differences between nationalities.

To mark New York Fashion week, CAM4 formed a collaboration with jewelry designer Chris Habana to open a pop-up store on the Lower East Side of New York City. The store is located just around the corner from a space previously used by Louis Vuitton. At the night's opening, high-profile models and sexual icons like François Sagat and Amanda Lepore modeled a new jewelry collection.  The pop-up store collaboration is open from September 5, 2019 until September 30, 2019 and aims to bring a dose of sex positivity to fashion week.

Industry recognition 
The XBIZ Award for Live Cam Site of the Year was awarded to CAM4 in 2015. In 2016, CAM4.com won an Adult Webcam Award for Best European Adult Webcam Website. Additionally, a CAM4 co-founder was inducted into the Adult Webcam Awards Hall of Fame.

Awards and nominations

See also
Internet pornography
Cybersex
Online chat

References

External links
 

Adult camming websites
Internet properties established in 2007
American erotica and pornography websites